Shakka is a 1981 Hindi-language action film, produced by Kailash Chopra under the Roop Enterprises banner and directed by Sham Ralhan. It stars Jeetendra, Simple Kapadia and music composed by Rajesh Roshan.

Plot
One night, some dark businessmen, the enemies of our nation, entered the house of an honest country-loving person to save their life. They ruthlessly murdered Shakka's parents in front of him. Shakka, only twelve years old, somehow managed to escape and ran for his life.

He did not stop in this race of life; he had a long way to go, his destination unknown – he aimed to find those murderers, those masked killers who had killed his parents and he had to unmask them.

Days passed, years passed, childhood went and came manhood; Shakka had all the power of youth and also the blood of his brave parents, which was like lava bubbling within him; impatient to turn his enemies to ashes.

To reach those murderers, Shakka had to cross all those paths filled with crime and poison; those paths which change a man into a devil. Shakka also became like a devil in his neighborhood and he became one of the groups of devils who were responsible for the murder of his parents. On this road of crime, Shakka met Meena, who was a renowned thief. She too, like Shakka, was lonely in life, brought up by a criminal and left alone on those roads of crime.

When Shakka was very near to his destination, he learned that the real culprit behind the murder of his parents was Seth Dharamdas, who is now leading the life of a very rich nobleman.

On one hand, Shakka's heart was filled with hatred because of the bloody incident in his childhood, but, on the other hand, was a streak of love. Meena's love; that Meena with whom he had spent several hours playing at the seaside, he used to collect all kinds of shells for his Meena and see the wonders of fate.

Today, the girl thief Meena is the same Meena of his childhood days. Shakka had found his lost love, but when he discovered that his Meena was the daughter of the real murderer Seth Dharamdas, he was stunned because there was one Meena in Seth Dharamdas' house and Shakka believed her to be the real Meena.

Cast

Jeetendra as Shakka
Simple Kapadia as Meena
Zaheera as Meena
Prem Chopra as Prem
Kader Khan as Qasim Bhai
Helen as Janki
Nirupa Roy as Geeta
Om Shivpuri as Captain Dharamdas
Satyendra Kapoor as Satyen
Chandrashekhar as Police Inspector
Pinchoo Kapoor as John
Paintal as Jail Inmate
Ram Mohan as Jail Inmate
Birbal as Jail Inmate
Jagdish Raj as Raghu
Kamaldeep as Bagga
Sheetal

Soundtrack 
Lyrics: Verma Malik

Trivia
The song "Yaar Tere Sab Naach Rahe Hai" by Mohammed Rafi has been very popular even till today. It is played at many weddings during the occasion of Baaraat Departure to Dulhan house.

References

External links

1980s Hindi-language films
Films scored by Rajesh Roshan